HD 188015 is a yellow-hued star with an exoplanetary companion in the northern constellation of Vulpecula. It has an apparent visual magnitude of 8.24, making it an 8th magnitude star, and thus is too faint to be readily visible to the naked eye. The distance to this star can be estimated through parallax measurements, which yield a separation of 165.5 light years from the Sun.

This star was assigned a stellar classification of G5IV by J. F. Heard in 1956, matching the spectrum of an evolving G-type subgiant star. This suggests it has ceased or is about to stop hydrogen fusion in its core. The absolute magnitude of 4.47 lies just above the main sequence. It is estimated to be six billion years old and is chromospherically quiet with a projected rotational velocity of 5 km/s. The star is almost twice as metal-rich as the Sun. It has 1.1 times the mass and 1.2 times the radius of the Sun. HD 188015 is radiating 1.4 times the luminosity of the Sun from its photosphere at an effective temperature of 5,726 km/s.

Companions
A stellar common proper motion candidate was announced in 2006 and designated HD 188015 B. It is located at an angular separation of  along a position angle of 85°.

A Jovian planetary companion to this star was announced in 2005, based on radial velocity measurements indicating a periodic perturbation. The inclination of the orbital plane remains unknown, so only a lower bound on the planet's mass can be determined. It has a minimum mass equal to 1.5 times the mass of Jupiter. The orbital path of this object intersects the habitable zone of the star, which is likely to eject any Earth-like planet from that region.

See also
 HD 187085
 List of extrasolar planets

References

External links
 

G-type subgiants
Planetary systems with one confirmed planet
Vulpecula
Durchmusterung objects
188015
097769